Hom Wing Gim (January 22, 1908 – March 15, 1973), known professionally as H.W. Gim, was a Chinese-American film and television character actor who had a career from 1937 to 1972. While most of his parts were smaller, often-uncredited roles, Gim was occasionally given a more substantial supporting roles such as in many John Wayne films such as In Old California (1942) and McLintock! (1963).

Biography
Gim was born in January 1908 in China as Hom Wing Gim. His acting debut was in the 1937 film The Good Earth. Noted as one the busiest character actors in Hollywood, he was known as "Peanuts" to casting directors. By 1965, his 30th year acting, the five-foot actor had been in 159 films.

Gim died on March 15, 1973, in Los Angeles, California.

Filmography

Film

Television

References

External links 

 
 
 

20th-century Chinese male actors
1908 births
1973 deaths
Chinese emigrants to the United States